The Magnolia Service Station is a historic service station located on Old U.S. Route 66 in Texola, Oklahoma. The station, an affiliate of the Magnolia Petroleum Company, opened circa 1930. The station was one of the westernmost in Oklahoma and became one of the first stops for eastbound travelers to buy gas and auto services in the state. The main building of the service station is representative of the "house" style of filling station; such stations resembled small houses in order to fit into residential areas.

The service station was added to the National Register of Historic Places on February 23, 1995.

History 
The station opened in 1930, first owned by Albert Hutto, who later sold it to Frank Skinner. The station sold Magnolia Petroleum products until 1955, when it was sold again and began carrying Phillips 66 products, before closing in the 1960s. The structure was originally built with just the central block building, with the canopy and side garage added on later. The sign on the structure, advertising a former mechanic shop, had its lettering removed by 2019.

Condition 
Despite historic status, the building remains in an advanced state of decay. , the side garage had been completely removed after being damaged for many years, the canopy has partially collapsed, and the interior is also in extremely poor condition.

See also

References

External links

Gas stations on the National Register of Historic Places in Oklahoma
Commercial buildings completed in 1930
Buildings and structures in Beckham County, Oklahoma
U.S. Route 66 in Oklahoma
Buildings and structures on U.S. Route 66
National Register of Historic Places in Beckham County, Oklahoma